Renenūtet (also transliterated Ernūtet, Renen-wetet, Renenet) was a goddess of nourishment and the harvest in the ancient Egyptian religion. The importance of the harvest caused people to make many offerings to Renenutet during harvest time.  
Initially, her cult was centered in Terenuthis. Renenutet was depicted as a cobra or as a woman with the head of a cobra.

The verbs "to fondle, to nurse, or rear" help explain the name Renenutet. This goddess was a "nurse" who took care of the pharaoh from birth to death.

She was the female counterpart of Shai, "destiny", who represented the positive destiny of the child. Renenutet was called Thermouthis or Hermouthis in Greek. She embodied the fertility of the fields and was the protector of the royal office and power.

Sometimes, as the goddess of nourishment, Renenutet was seen as having a husband, Sobek. He was represented as the Nile River, the annual flooding of which deposited the fertile silt that enabled abundant harvests. The temple of Medinet Madi is dedicated to both Sobek and Renenutet. It is a small and decorated building in the Faiyum.

More usually, Renenutet was seen as the mother of Nehebkau who occasionally was also represented as a snake. When considered the mother of Nehebkau, Renenutet was seen as having a husband, Geb, who represented the earth.

She was the mother of the god Nepri.

Later, as a snake goddess worshiped over the whole of Lower Egypt, Renenutet was increasingly associated with Wadjet, Lower Egypt's powerful protector and another snake goddess represented as a cobra. Eventually Renenutet was identified as an alternate form of Wadjet, whose gaze was said to slaughter enemies. Wadjet was the cobra shown on the crown of the pharaohs.

References

External links
 

Childhood goddesses
Egyptian goddesses
Food goddesses
Food deities
Harvest goddesses
Snake goddesses
Wadjet

ca:Llista de personatges de la mitologia egípcia#R